Satyendra Murli (born 14 February 1983) is a researcher, media pedagogue and a journalist. He has been associated with Doordarshan (DD News), (public service broadcaster of India, Prasar Bharti, government of India) as an Indian television journalist; and other several media organizations. He teaches at university level as an assistant professor of communication and media studies. His research areas are communication, mass media, journalism, media studies, media pedagogy, Buddhism; and open and distance learning.

Satyendra Murli follows the ideology of Buddha and he is popularly known as an Ambedkarite journalist. He has been actively participating in social and political movements based on Phule-Ambedkar ideology for a long time, more than two decades. He strengthens the voice for human rights, freedom of speech, women rights, rights of tribals and dalits (indigenous people), diversity in media, representation of other backward classes (OBC) and religious minority.

Early life and education

Satyendra Murli is born in the Jatav family to Sushila Devi Jatav and Santoshi Ram Jatav in Birana, Dausa (Rajasthan), India. His grandfather was Shri Murli Ram Jatav, a farmer and a social leader.

Satyendra did his schooling at the Jawahar Navodaya Vidyalaya (JNV), Dausa; Shanti Niketan School, Mahwa and GSSS, Bhilwara with science subjects. After graduating with a Bachelor of Arts degree in public administration, geography and Hindi literature from the University of Rajasthan (Jaipur); he completed his Master of Journalism and Mass Communication from the Centre for Mass Communication (Jaipur). He did PGDHJ from Indian Institute of Mass Communication, Ministry for I & B (New Delhi). Satyendra Murli did his M.Phil. research degree on Buddhist ethics and news media from Gautam Buddha University, Greater Noida, Uttarpradesh. He registered as a PhD research scholar and worked on media pedagogy.

Family and personal life
Satyendra Murli has two brothers and two sisters. Both his brothers are B.Tech. graduates from Indian Institute of Technology (IIT), Roorkee; elder brother is political leader and younger is an IES officer. His father is a tax consultant; and mother is a meditation guru; earlier she was a political leader and has contested Dausa district council election. His maternal grandfather Shri Mohan Lal Yadav was a social leader; and maternal great-grandfather Shri Bhoop Singh Yadav was a congress leader and municipality chairman in Hindaun city. Satyendra married Ruchi Nimbe, on the occasion of birth anniversary of Satguru Ravidas Maharaj on 22 February 2016. Ruchi graduated with B.Tech. in Information Technology.

Voice against casteism
Satyendra Murli a journalist with Doordarshan passionately spoke of double standards in the media. He argues, "If so-called lower caste or Dalit journalists raise their voice against the casteism, they are accused of being casteist and the ones actually perpetuating this casteism actually become national journalists". He strongly urged journalists to stand together on issues of casteism and reservation.

Controversies
Satyendra Murli was criticised for raising issues relating to women, and had only shared a cartoon showing Mahatma Gandhi with a few women in the month of June 2012 on his Facebook account, but soon a case was lodged against him under various sections charging him of insulting the Father of the Nation. He raised women issues, he wrote a comment under the cartoon, ‘Are Indian women not awaken this much that they could raise voice against exploitation'.

Soon, Congress led Rajasthan state government committee lodged a case (dated 6 June 2012) under sections 67, 67 A of IT Act, 4 and 6 of Indecent Representative of Women (Prohibition) Act and 292 of Indian Penal Code against Satyendra Murli. He sent a clarification to the police. However, the police raided his house. In his absence, they tortured his family persons and took his bike.

On 24 November 2016, Doordarshan journalist Satyendra Murli, claimed that the Prime Minister’s ‘live’ address had actually been pre-recorded and edited. At a press conference held at the Press Club of India in New Delhi, Satyendra Murli alleged that Narendra Modi misled the citizens of the country by recording the announcement and took a unilateral decision to demonetise notes, which made up over 85 per cent in circulation. He has filed an RTI requesting this information be made public.

According to Satyendra Murli, Modi's 8 November address was not live, but recorded and edited. It had been written many days before the RBI's proposal (not decision), on the subject at 6 p.m. of 8 November and the briefing of the Cabinet by Modi at 7 p.m. Modi's address was broadcast at 8:15 p.m. with a live band, to create the impression that the decision had been taken suddenly, and the public would believe that the matter had been kept fully secret, but it was certainly not so. Whether the Government of India rules under Transaction of Business Rules, 1961 and the RBI Act, 1934, have been followed, is a moot question.

References

External links

1983 births
Living people
Doordarshan journalists
Indian Institute of Mass Communication alumni
Gautam Buddha University
Indian Buddhists
University of Rajasthan